The men's disappearing target small-bore rifle was one of 15 events on the Shooting at the 1908 Summer Olympics programme. Regulation of the equipment used in the event was done through allowing the use of .22 or .297/.230 caliber ammunition. Magnifying and telescopic sights were prohibited. The target used was a three-quarter length silhouette, 4 inches high and 1.5 wide. It would appear at a distance of 25 yards for three seconds and then disappear for five until it had been seen a total of 15 times. A hit on the upper two-thirds of the figure counted for 3 points, while any other hit counted for 1. The maximum score was thus 45 points. Each nation could enter up to 12 shooters.

8 shooters scored the maximum possible score. The method of breaking the tie is unknown.

Results

References

Sources
 
 

Men's rifle small-bore individual disappearing